Dermanura rava is a species of leaf-nosed bat found in Central and South America.

Taxonomy
Dermanura rava was described as a new species in 1902 by American zoologist Gerrit Smith Miller Jr. The holotype had been collected in San Javier of northern Ecuador by "G. Fleming", often given by others as Flemming. Georg Flemming was a collector of biological specimens for William Frederick Henry Rosenberg, along with Rudolf Miketta. Dermanura species have frequently been included in the genus Artibeus, so D. rava has also been known as Artibeus ravus. Additionally, it was listed as a synonym of the pygmy fruit-eating bat (Dermanura phaeotis) in 1978 and 1982 publications. However, subsequent molecular analysis showed that D. rava was genetically distinct from the pygmy fruit-eating bat. Its sister taxon is Andersen's fruit-eating bat (Dermanura anderseni).

Description
Its fur is yellowish brown, and its face has four indistinct, whitish stripes. Its ears and flight membranes are light brown, with the margins of the flight membranes whitish.

Range and habitat
D. rava is found in the following countries: Panama, Colombia, Ecuador, and Peru.

Conservation
As of 2019, it is evaluated as a least-concern species by the IUCN. It meets the criteria for this designation because of its wide geographic range, which includes large tracts of intact forest. It is considered relatively abundant, and no major threats to it or its habitat have been identified.

References

Taxa named by Gerrit Smith Miller Jr.
Mammals described in 1902
Bats of Central America
Bats of South America
Dermanura